Gastrochilus kadooriei is a species of Gastrochilus. published in the journal Phytotaxa on 4 April 2014. This species is endemic to Indo-Burma Biodiversity Hotspot and distributed in China, Laos and Vietnam. This was recently discovered in Hong Kong and has been named after Sir Horace Kadoorie.

References 

kadooriei
Flora of Hong Kong